Lacinius ephippiatus is a species of arachnid belonging to the family Phalangiidae.

It is native to Europe.

References

Harvestmen